Denis John Earp  (7 June 1930- 19 May 2019) was a South African military commander, who held the post of Chief of the South African Air Force.

Career
He attended Grey College, Bloemfontein, Military College in 1948 and joined the SAAF in 1950. After qualifying as a pilot he served in Korea with 2 Squadron SAAF. He was forced to bale out over enemy territory and was a POW for 23 months.

Released in September 1953, he was posted to 1 Squadron till January 1957. Then he spent two years as an instructor at Central Flying Service Dunnottar before being appointed as a pilot attack instructor at the Air Operations School.

In 1964 he spent time in England converting to Canberra light bombers and on his return served as a pilot at 12 (Canberra) Squadron at Waterkloof Air Force Base.

In December 1967 he returned to 2 Squadron as commanding officer. Eighteen months later he was appointed commandant flying at Air
Force Base Pietersburg and after that senior staff officer (air) of the Joint Combat Forces.

His career took an unusual turn when he converted to helicopters and became officer commanding 17 Squadron at Air Force Base Waterkloof.

After that he became senior staff officer operations at SAAF Headquarters, then director operations from 1 June 1976, to 1978 and director general operations at Defence Headquarters in the rank of major general from 19 June 1978.

He served as Chief of the Air Force from 1984 to 1988

His son, Lieutenant Michael Earp, was a helicopter pilot who was killed in the Border War on 5 January 1982.

Aircraft flown
 North American P-51 Mustang 
 SAF Dassault Mirage 20000

Honours and awards
Gen Earp received the following Awards and Decorations:
 1987
 1986
 1976
 1973
 n.d.
 1953 South African Korea Medal
 n.d. United Nations Service Medal for Korea 
 n.d.  Korean War Service Medal
 1952South Korea South Korean Order of Military Merit (Chungmu Cordon) with Silver Star (Korea, 1952)
 1952US
 1987
 n.d.ChileGran Cruz Al Merito Aeronautico
 n.d.ParaguayAl Merito Miltar

See also

List of South African military chiefs
South African Air Force

References

South African military personnel of the Korean War
1930 births
Korean War prisoners of war
South African prisoners of war
South African military personnel of the Border War
Chiefs of the South African Air Force
Recipients of the Order of Military Merit (Korea)
Recipients of the Air Medal
People from Bloemfontein
Alumni of Grey College, Bloemfontein
2019 deaths
White South African people